Rizwana Yasmeen (born: 4 September 1990) is a field hockey player from Pakistan. She is the captain of the national side (as of November 2020).

Career 
Yasmeen began her career in 2006. Her playing position is goalkeeper.

National 
At national competitions, Yasmeen represents WAPDA. At the National Women's Championships held in Islamabad in 2016, she was declared the tournament's best goalkeeper.

International 
In 2006, Yasmeen was one of the standbys for the 2006 Asian Games Qualifiers held in Kuala Lumpur, Malaysia. In 2010, she was part of the team selected to compete at the 2010 Asian Games Qualifiers held in Bangkok, Thailand. 

She participated in the 2nd Asian Hockey Challenge held in Bangkok, Thailand in September 2013 during which she earned 6 caps.   

In 2016, she was part of the team which reached the semi-finals of the 4th Women’s Asian Hockey Federation Cup which was held in Bangkok, Thailand. This was the first time that the national team had reached the semi-finals of the tournament.   

In 2017, Yasmeen was appointed the captain for the Asian Hockey Challenge held in Bandar Seri Begawan, Brunei. It was originally a six nation tournament but three teams pulled out before it started. Pakistan came runners up to Hong Kong, with Brunei placing third.   

Yasmeen led the national team at the 2018 Asian Games Qualifying Tournament in Bangkok, Thailand. There the team lost five of their matches, winning one against seventh placed Indonesia by a score of 3-0, their only goals in the tournament. The team placed sixth and did not qualify for the Games. Yasmeen played in 4 matches during the tournament sitting out against Kazakhstan and Singapore.    

Between 2013 and 2018 Yasmeen has been capped 18 times, winning 4 games and drawing 2.  As of 12 January 2018, she has earned 20 international caps.

Events participated in 

 Asian Games hockey qualifiers: 2018
Asian Hockey Federation (AHF) Cup: 2012, 2016 
 Asian Hockey Challenge: 2013, 2017 
 30th Surjeet Sing Hockey Tournament 2014 Jalander, India

References 

Living people
1990 births
Pakistani_women_field_hockey_players